This is a list of notable events in Latin music (music from Spanish- and Portuguese-speaking areas from Latin America, Europe, and the United States) that took place in 1991.

Events 
February 20 – The 33rd Annual Grammy Awards are held at the Radio City Music Hall in New York City.
José Feliciano wins the Grammy Award for Best Latin Pop Performance for his song "¿Por Qué Te Tengo Que Olvidar?"
Tito Puente wins the Grammy Award for Best Tropical Performance for his song "Lambada Timbales"
The Texas Tornados wins the Grammy Award for Best Mexican-American Performance for their song "Soy de San Luis".
 May 23 – The 4th Annual Lo Nuestro Awards are held at the James L. Knight Center in Miami, Florida. Mexican singer Ana Gabriel and Dominican group Juan Luis Guerra & 4.40 are the most awarded artists with three wins.
 November 19 – Luis Miguel releases Romance, a collection of boleros previously recorded by other artists. The album's success led to a resurgence of interest in the bolero genre in the 1990s.

Bands formed 
Ricky Martin (Latin pop)
Shakira (Latin pop)
Grupo Mojado
Esmeralda
Lalo y Los Descalzos
Tecno Banda
Alex d'Castro
Antonio Cruz
Xavier

Bands reformed

Bands disbanded

Bands on hiatus

Number-ones albums and singles by country 
List of number-one albums of 1991 (Spain)
List of number-one singles of 1991 (Spain)
List of number-one Billboard Top Latin Albums of 1991
List of number-one Billboard Hot Latin Tracks of 1991

Awards 
1991 Premio Lo Nuestro
1991 Tejano Music Awards

Albums released

First quarter

January

February

March

Second quarter

April

May

June

Third quarter

July

August

September

Fourth quarter

October

November

December

Unknown date

Best-selling records

Best-selling albums
The following is a list of the top 5 best-selling Latin albums of 1991 in the United States in the categories of Latin pop, Regional Mexican, and Tropical/salsa, according to Billboard.

Best-performing songs
The following is a list of the top 10 best-performing Latin songs in the United States in 1991, according to Billboard.

Births 
February 1 – Martha Heredia, Dominican singer 
February 14 – Karol G, Colombian reggaeton singer
February 17Raymix, Mexican cumbia singer
March 13 – Luan Santana, Brazilian sertanejo singer
March 22 – Sophia Abrahão, Brazilian actress and singer
 April 4 – Lucas Lucco, Brazilian singer, songwriter, and actor
May 2Farruko, Puerto Rican reggaeton singer
July 3 – Rolf Sanchez, Dutch salsa singer
September 9 - Amanda Magalhães, Brazilian actress and singer
October 10 – Lali Espósito, Argentine pop singer

Deaths 
April 29 – Gonzaguinha, Brazilian MPB singer
August 17 – Sola, Mexican singer
September 22 – Tino Casal, Spanish rock singer

References 

 
Latin music by year